Hajapar is a village in Bhuj Taluka of Kachchh District of Gujarat State of India.  It is located at a distance of about 18 km from Bhuj. One nearby village is Reha. As per some old records & books of Kutch Gurjar Kashtriya community Hajapar was  also known as Rajapar in olden days. Rajapar is to be named after RAJAJI VARU. RAJAJI VARU was a bravest warrior and his Paliya at Jodiya town behind government high school and gita mandir. Many Paliyas are also there. The Paliyas in the memory of battle was fought for cattle herd under the leadership of RAJAJI VARU against cattle herd theft group at battlefield. RAJAJI VARU is a Surapura Dada of VARU family.  . .

History 
About the history of Hajapar it is one of the 19 villages founded by Kutch Gurjar Kshatriyas or Mistris. These Mistris first moved into Saurashtra in early 7th century and later a major group entered Kutch in 12th century & established themselves at Dhaneti. Later from 12th century onwards they moved to settle themselves between Anjar and Bhuj and founded the villages of Anjar, Sinugra, Khambhra, Nagalpar, Khedoi, Madhapar, Hajapar, Kukma, Galpadar, Reha, Vidi, Ratnal, Jambudi, Devaliya, Lovaria, Nagor, Chandiya, Meghpar and Kumbharia.

Temples 
Hanuman Mandir built by Nanji Govindji Tank of village is in the outskirts. Thakur mandir and Kuldevi temples of many clans of these Kutch Gurjar Kshatriya community are also there; for example there is the temple of Pithal Maa, Kuldevi of Parmars of Hajapar, Loharia.

References 

Villages in Kutch district